Banca is a rural locality in the local government area (LGA) of Dorset in the North-east LGA region of Tasmania. The 2016 census recorded a population of nil for the state suburb of Banca.

History 
The locality was gazetted as “The Banca” in 1969, and re-gazetted as Banca in 1985. It was originally the site of a tin mine.

Geography
The Boobyalla River forms part of the southern boundary and then flows through from south to north. The Tomahawk River forms part of the western boundary. The eastern boundary loosely follows the Little Boobyalla River.

Road infrastructure 
Route C840 (Banca Road) passes through from south to north.

References

Towns in Tasmania
Localities of Dorset Council (Australia)